

Events

Pre-1600
43 BC – Legions loyal to the Roman Senate, commanded by Gaius Pansa, defeat the forces of Mark Antony in the Battle of Forum Gallorum.
69 – Vitellius, commanding Rhine-based armies, defeats Roman emperor Otho in the First Battle of Bedriacum to take power over Rome.
 966 – Following his marriage to the Christian Doubravka of Bohemia, the pagan ruler of the Polans, Mieszko I, converts to Christianity, an event considered to be the founding of the Polish state.
 972 – Otto II, Co-Emperor of the Holy Roman Empire, marries Byzantine princess Theophanu. She is crowned empress by Pope John XIII in Rome the same day.
1395 – Tokhtamysh–Timur war: At the Battle of the Terek River, Timur defeats the army of the Golden Horde, beginning the khanate's permanent military decline.
1471 – In England, the Yorkists under Edward IV defeat the Lancastrians under the Earl of Warwick at the Battle of Barnet; the Earl is killed and Edward resumes the throne.
1561 – A celestial phenomenon is reported over Nuremberg, described as an aerial battle.

1601–1900
1639 – Thirty Years' War: Forces of the Holy Roman Empire and Electorate of Saxony are defeated by the Swedes at the Battle of Chemnitz, ending the military effectiveness of the Saxon army for the rest of the war and allowing the Swedes to advance into Bohemia.
1775 – The Society for the Relief of Free Negroes Unlawfully Held in Bondage, the first abolition society in North America, is organized in Philadelphia by Benjamin Franklin and Benjamin Rush.
1816 – Bussa, a slave in British-ruled Barbados, leads a slave rebellion, for which he is remembered as the country's first national hero.
1849 – Hungary declares itself independent of Austria with Lajos Kossuth as its leader.
1865 
U.S. President Abraham Lincoln is shot in Ford's Theatre by John Wilkes Booth; Lincoln dies the following day.
  William H. Seward, the U.S. Secretary of State, and his family are attacked at home by Lewis Powell.
  1881 – The Four Dead in Five Seconds Gunfight is fought in El Paso, Texas.
  1890 – The Pan-American Union is founded by the First International Conference of American States in Washington, D.C.
  1894 – The first ever commercial motion picture house opens in New York City, United States. It uses ten Kinetoscopes, devices for peep-show viewing of films.
  1900 – The world's fair Exposition Universelle opens in Paris.

1901–present
1906 – The first meeting of the Azusa Street Revival, which will launch Pentecostalism as a worldwide movement, is held in Los Angeles.
1909 – Muslims in the Ottoman Empire begin a massacre of Armenians in Adana.
1912 – The British passenger liner  hits an iceberg in the North Atlantic and begins to sink.
1928 – The Bremen, a German Junkers W 33 type aircraft, reaches Greenly Island, Canada, completing the first successful transatlantic aeroplane flight from east to west.
1929 – The inaugural Monaco Grand Prix takes place in the Principality of Monaco. William Grover-Williams wins driving a Bugatti Type 35.
1931 – The Spanish Cortes deposes King Alfonso XIII and proclaims the Second Spanish Republic.
1935 – The Black Sunday dust storm, considered one of the worst storms of the Dust Bowl, sweeps across the Oklahoma and Texas panhandles and neighboring areas.
1940 – World War II: Royal Marines land in Namsos, Norway, preceding a larger force which will arrive two days later.
1941 – World War II: German and Italian forces attack Tobruk, Libya.
1944 – Bombay explosion: A massive explosion in Bombay harbor kills 300 and causes economic damage valued at 20 million pounds.
1945 – Razing of Friesoythe: The 4th Canadian (Armoured) Division deliberately destroys the German town of Friesoythe on the orders of Major General Christopher Vokes.
1958 – The Soviet satellite Sputnik 2 falls from orbit after a mission duration of 162 days. This was the first spacecraft to carry a living animal, a female dog named Laika, who likely lived only a few hours.
1967 – Gnassingbé Eyadéma overthrows Nicolas Grunitzky and installs himself as the new President of Togo, a title he will hold for the next 38 years.
1978 – Tbilisi demonstrations: Thousands of Georgians demonstrate against Soviet attempts to change the constitutional status of the Georgian language.
1979 – The Progressive Alliance of Liberia stages a protest, without a permit, against an increase in rice prices proposed by the government, with clashes between protestors and the police resulting in over 70 deaths and over 500 injuries.
1981 – STS-1: The first operational Space Shuttle, Columbia completes its first test flight.
1986 – The heaviest hailstones ever recorded, each weighing , fall on the Gopalganj district of Bangladesh, killing 92.
1988
The  strikes a mine in the Persian Gulf during Operation Earnest Will.
  In a United Nations ceremony in Geneva, Switzerland, the Soviet Union signs an agreement pledging to withdraw its troops from Afghanistan.
1991 – The Republic of Georgia introduces the post of President following its declaration of independence from the Soviet Union.
1994 – In a friendly fire incident during Operation Provide Comfort in northern Iraq, two U.S. Air Force aircraft mistakenly shoot-down two U.S. Army helicopters, killing 26 people.
1997 – Pai Hsiao-yen, daughter of Taiwanese artiste Pai Bing-bing is kidnapped on her way to school, preceding her murder.
1999
NATO mistakenly bombs a convoy of ethnic Albanian refugees. Yugoslav officials say 75 people were killed.
  A severe hailstorm strikes Sydney, Australia causing A$2.3 billion in insured damages, the most costly natural disaster in Australian history.
2002 – Venezuelan President Hugo Chávez returns to office two days after being ousted and arrested by the country's military.
2003
The Human Genome Project is completed with 99% of the human genome sequenced to an accuracy of 99.99%.
U.S. troops in Baghdad capture Abu Abbas, leader of the Palestinian group that killed an American on the hijacked cruise liner  in 1985.
2005 – The Oregon Supreme Court nullifies marriage licenses issued to same-sex couples a year earlier by Multnomah County.
2006 – Twin blasts triggered by crude bombs during Asr prayer in the Jama Masjid mosque in Delhi injure 13 people.
2014 – In Nigeria, Boko Haram set up Twin bombings in Abuja, and abducted two hundred seventy-six schoolgirls in Chibok.
2016 – The foreshock of Kumamoto earthquakes occurs in Japan.
2022 – Russian invasion of Ukraine: The Russian warship Moskva sinks.

Births

Pre-1600
1126 – Averroes, Andalusian Arab physician and philosopher (d. 1198)
1204 – Henry I, king of Castile (d. 1217)
1331 – Jeanne-Marie de Maille, French Roman Catholic saint (d. 1414)
1527 – Abraham Ortelius, Flemish cartographer and geographer (d. 1598)
1572 – Adam Tanner, Austrian mathematician, philosopher, and academic (d. 1632)
1578 – Philip III of Spain (d. 1621)

1601–1900
1629 – Christiaan Huygens, Dutch mathematician, astronomer, and physicist (d. 1695)
1669 – Magnus Julius De la Gardie, Swedish general and politician (d. 1741)
1678 – Abraham Darby I, English iron master (d. 1717)
1709 – Charles Collé, French playwright and songwriter (d. 1783)
1714 – Adam Gib, Scottish minister and author (d. 1788)
1738 – William Cavendish-Bentinck, 3rd Duke of Portland, English politician, Prime Minister of the United Kingdom (d. 1809)
1769 – Barthélemy Catherine Joubert, French general (d. 1799)
1773 – Jean-Baptiste de Villèle, French politician, Prime Minister of France (d. 1854)
1788 – David G. Burnet, American politician, 2nd Vice-President of Texas (d. 1870)
1800 – John Appold, English engineer (d. 1865)
1812 – George Grey, Portuguese-New Zealand soldier, explorer, and politician, 11th Prime Minister of New Zealand (d. 1898)
1814 – Dimitri Kipiani, Georgian publicist and author (d. 1887)
1819 – Harriett Ellen Grannis Arey, American educator, author, editor, and publisher (d. 1901)
1827 – Augustus Pitt Rivers, English general, ethnologist, and archaeologist (d. 1900)
1852 – Alexander Greenlaw Hamilton, Australian biologist (d. 1941)
1854 – Martin Lipp, Estonian pastor and poet (d. 1923)
1857 – Princess Beatrice of the United Kingdom (d. 1944)
1865 – Alfred Hoare Powell, English architect, and designer and painter of pottery (d. 1960)
1866 – Anne Sullivan, American educator (d. 1936)
1868 – Peter Behrens, German architect, designed the AEG turbine factory (d. 1940)
1870 – Victor Borisov-Musatov, Russian painter and educator (d. 1905)
  1870   – Syd Gregory, Australian cricketer and coach (d. 1929)
1872 – Abdullah Yusuf Ali, Indian-English scholar and translator (d. 1953)
1876 – Cecil Chubb, English barrister and one time owner of Stonehenge (d. 1934)
1881 – Husain Salaahuddin, Maldivian poet and scholar (d. 1948)
1882 – Moritz Schlick, German-Austrian physicist and philosopher (d. 1936)
1886 – Ernst Robert Curtius, German philologist and scholar (d. 1956)
  1886   – Árpád Tóth, Hungarian poet and translator (d. 1928)
1889 – Arnold J. Toynbee, English historian and academic (d. 1975)
1891 – B. R. Ambedkar, Indian economist, jurist, and politician, 1st Indian Minister of Law and Justice (d. 1956)
  1891   – Otto Lasanen, Finnish wrestler (d. 1958)
1892 – Juan Belmonte, Spanish bullfighter (d. 1962)
  1892   – V. Gordon Childe, Australian archaeologist and philologist (d. 1957)
  1892   – Claire Windsor, American actress (d. 1972)
1900 – Shivrampant Damle, Indian educationist (d. 1977)

1901–present
1902 – Sylvio Mantha, Canadian ice hockey player, coach, and referee (d. 1974)
1903 – Henry Corbin, French philosopher and academic (d. 1978)
  1903   – Ruth Svedberg, Swedish discus thrower and triathlete (d. 2002)
1904 – John Gielgud, English actor, director, and producer (d. 2000)
1905 – Elizabeth Huckaby, American author and educator (d. 1999)
  1905   – Georg Lammers, German sprinter (d. 1987)
  1905   – Jean Pierre-Bloch, French author and activist (d. 1999)
1906 – Faisal of Saudi Arabia, Saudi Arabian king (d. 1975)
1907 – François Duvalier, Haitian physician and politician, 40th President of Haiti (d. 1971)
1912 – Robert Doisneau, French photographer and journalist (d. 1994)
  1912   – Georg Siimenson, Estonian footballer (d. 1978)
1913 – Jean Fournet, French conductor (d. 2008)
1916 – Don Willesee, Australian telegraphist and politician, 29th Australian Minister for Foreign Affairs (d. 2003)
1917 – Valerie Hobson, English actress (d. 1998)
  1917   – Marvin Miller, American baseball executive (d. 2012)
1918 – Mary Healy, American actress and singer (d. 2015)
1919 – Shamshad Begum, Pakistani-Indian singer (d. 2013)
  1919   – K. Saraswathi Amma, Indian author and playwright (d. 1975)
1920 – Ivor Forbes Guest, English lawyer, historian, and author (d. 2018)
1921 – Thomas Schelling, American economist and academic, Nobel Prize laureate (d. 2016)
1922 – Audrey Long, American actress (d. 2014)
1923 – Roberto De Vicenzo, Argentinian golfer (d. 2017)
1924 – Shorty Rogers, American trumpet player and composer (d. 1994)
  1924   – Joseph Ruskin, American actor and producer (d. 2013)
  1924   – Mary Warnock, Baroness Warnock, English philosopher, and academic (d. 2019)
1925 – Abel Muzorewa, Zimbabwean minister and politician, 1st Prime Minister of Zimbabwe Rhodesia (d. 2010)
  1925   – Rod Steiger, American soldier and actor (d. 2002)
1926 – Barbara Anderson, New Zealand author (d. 2013)
  1926   – Frank Daniel, Czech director, producer, and screenwriter (d. 1996)
  1926   – Gloria Jean, American actress and singer (d. 2018)
  1926   – Liz Renay, American actress and author (d. 2007)
1927 – Alan MacDiarmid, New Zealand chemist and academic, Nobel Prize laureate (d. 2007)
  1927   – Dany Robin, French actress and singer (d. 1995)
1929 – Gerry Anderson, English director, producer, and screenwriter (d. 2012)
  1929   – Inez Andrews, African-American singer-songwriter (d. 2012)
1930 – Martin Adolf Bormann, German priest and theologian (d. 2013)
  1930   – Arnold Burns, American lawyer and politician, 21st United States Deputy Attorney General (d. 2013)
  1930   – René Desmaison, French mountaineer (d. 2007)
  1930   – Bradford Dillman, American actor and author (d. 2018)
1931 – Geoffrey Dalton, English admiral (d. 2020)
  1931   – Paul Masnick, Canadian ice hockey player
1932 – Bill Bennett, Canadian lawyer and politician, 27th Premier of British Columbia (d. 2015)
  1932   – Atef Ebeid, Egyptian academic and politician, 47th Prime Minister of Egypt (d. 2014)
  1932   – Loretta Lynn, American singer-songwriter and musician (d. 2022)
  1932   – Cameron Parker, Scottish businessman and politician, Lord Lieutenant of Renfrewshire
1933 – Paddy Hopkirk, Northern Irish racing driver (d. 2022)
  1933   – Boris Strugatsky, Russian author (d. 2012)
  1933   – Yuri Oganessian, Armenian-Russian nuclear physicist
1934 – Fredric Jameson, American philosopher and theorist
1935 – Susan Cunliffe-Lister, Baroness Masham of Ilton, English table tennis player, swimmer, and politician
  1935   – John Oliver, English bishop
  1935   – Erich von Däniken, Swiss pseudohistorian and author
1936 – Arlene Martel, American actress and singer (d. 2014)
  1936   – Bobby Nichols, American golfer
  1936   – Frank Serpico, American-Italian soldier, police officer and lecturer
1937 – Efi Arazi, Israeli businessman, founded the Scailex Corporation (d. 2013)
  1937   – Sepp Mayerl, Austrian mountaineer (d. 2012)
1938 – Mahmud Esad Coşan, Turkish author and academic (d. 2001)
1940 – Julie Christie, English actress and activist
  1940   – David Hope, Baron Hope of Thornes, English archbishop and academic
  1940   – Richard Thompson, English physician and academic
1941 – Pete Rose, American baseball player and manager
1942 – Valeriy Brumel, Soviet high jumper (d. 2003)
  1942   – Valentin Lebedev, Russian engineer and astronaut
  1942   – Björn Rosengren, Swedish politician, Swedish Minister of Enterprise and Innovation
1944 – John Sergeant, English journalist
1945 – Tuilaepa Aiono Sailele Malielegaoi, Samoan economist and politician, 8th Prime Minister of Samoa
  1945   – Ritchie Blackmore, English guitarist and songwriter
  1945   – Roger Frappier, Canadian producer, director and screenwriter
1946 – Mireille Guiliano, French-American author
  1946   – Michael Sarris, Cypriot economist and politician, Cypriot Minister of Finance
  1946   – Knut Kristiansen, Norwegian pianist and orchestra leader
1947 – Dominique Baudis, French journalist and politician (d. 2014)
  1947   – Bob Massie, Australian cricketer
1948 – Berry Berenson, American model, actress, and photographer (d. 2001)
  1948   – Anastasios Papaligouras, Greek lawyer and politician, Greek Minister of Justice
1949 – Dave Gibbons, English author and illustrator
  1949   – DeAnne Julius, American-British economist and academic
  1949   – Chris Langham, English actor and screenwriter
  1949   – Chas Mortimer, English motorcycle racer
  1949   – John Shea, American actor and director
1950 – Francis Collins, American physician and geneticist
  1950   – Péter Esterházy, Hungarian author (d. 2016)
1951 – Milija Aleksic, English footballer (d. 2012)
  1951   – José Eduardo González Navas, Spanish politician
  1951   – Julian Lloyd Webber, English cellist, conductor, and educator
  1951   – Elizabeth Symons, Baroness Symons of Vernham Dean, English politician
1952 – Kenny Aaronson, American bass player 
  1952   – Mickey O'Sullivan, Irish footballer and manager
  1952   – David Urquhart, Scottish bishop
1954 – Katsuhiro Otomo, Japanese director, screenwriter, and illustrator
1956 – Boris Šprem, Croatian lawyer and politician, 8th President of Croatian Parliament (d. 2012)
1957 – Lothaire Bluteau, Canadian actor
  1957   – Mikhail Pletnev, Russian pianist, composer, and conductor
1958 – Peter Capaldi, Scottish actor
1959 – Steve Byrnes, American sportscaster and producer (d. 2015)
  1959   – Marie-Thérèse Fortin, Canadian actress
1960 – Brad Garrett, American actor and comedian
  1960   – Myoma Myint Kywe, Burmese historian and journalist
  1960   – Osamu Sato, Japanese graphic artist, programmer, and composer
  1960   – Tina Rosenberg, American journalist and author
  1960   – Pat Symcox, South African cricketer
1961 – Robert Carlyle, Scottish actor and director
1962 – Guillaume Leblanc, Canadian athlete
1964 – Brian Adams, American wrestler (d. 2007)
  1964   – Jeff Andretti, American race car driver
  1964   – Jim Grabb, American tennis player
  1964   – Jeff Hopkins, Welsh international footballer and manager
  1964   – Gina McKee, English actress
1965 – Tom Dey, American director and producer
  1965   – Alexandre Jardin, French author
  1965   – Craig McDermott, Australian cricketer and coach
1966 – André Boisclair, Canadian lawyer and politician
  1966   – Jan Boklöv, Swedish ski jumper 
  1966   – David Justice, American baseball player and sportscaster
  1966   – Greg Maddux, American baseball player, coach, and manager
1967 – Nicola Berti, Italian international footballer
  1967   – Barrett Martin, American drummer, songwriter, and producer 
  1967   – Julia Zemiro, French-Australian actress, comedian, singer and writer
1968 – Anthony Michael Hall, American actor
1969 – Brad Ausmus, American baseball player and manager
  1969   – Martyn LeNoble, Dutch-American bass player
  1969   – Vebjørn Selbekk, Norwegian journalist
1970 – Shizuka Kudo, Japanese singer and actress 
1971 – Miguel Calero, Colombian footballer and manager (d. 2012)
  1971   – Carlos Pérez, Dominican-American baseball player
  1971   – Gregg Zaun, American baseball player and sportscaster
1972 – Paul Devlin, English-Scottish footballer and manager
  1972   – Roberto Mejía, Dominican baseball player
  1972   – Dean Potter, American rock climber and BASE jumper (d. 2015)
1973 – Roberto Ayala, Argentinian footballer
  1973   – Adrien Brody, American actor
  1973   – Hidetaka Suehiro, Japanese video game director and writer
  1973   – David Miller, American tenor 
1974 – Da Brat, American rapper 
1975 – Lita, American wrestler
  1975   – Luciano Almeida, Brazilian footballer
  1975   – Avner Dorman, Israeli-American composer and academic
  1975   – Anderson Silva, Brazilian mixed martial artist and boxer
1976 – Christian Älvestam, Swedish singer-songwriter and guitarist 
  1976   – Georgina Chapman, English model, actress, and fashion designer, co-founded Marchesa
  1976   – Anna DeForge, American basketball player
  1976   – Kyle Farnsworth, American baseball player
  1976   – Nadine Faustin-Parker, Haitian hurdler
  1976   – Jason Wiemer, Canadian ice hockey player
1977 – Nate Fox, American basketball player (d. 2014)
  1977   – Martin Kaalma, Estonian footballer
  1977   – Sarah Michelle Gellar, American actress and producer
  1977   – Rob McElhenney, American actor, producer, and screenwriter
1978 – Roland Lessing, Estonian biathlete
1979 – Rebecca DiPietro, American wrestler and model
  1979   – Marios Elia, Cypriot footballer
  1979   – Ross Filipo, New Zealand rugby player
  1979   – Noé Pamarot, French footballer
  1979   – Kerem Tunçeri, Turkish basketball player
1980 – Win Butler, American-Canadian singer-songwriter and guitarist
  1980   – Jeremy Smith, New Zealand rugby league player
1981 – Mustafa Güngör, German rugby player
  1981   – Amy Leach, English director and producer
1982 – Uğur Boral, Turkish footballer
  1982   – Larissa França, Brazilian volleyball player
1983 – Simona La Mantia, Italian triple jumper
  1983   – James McFadden, Scottish footballer
  1983   – William Obeng, Ghanaian-American football player
  1983   – Nikoloz Tskitishvili, Georgian basketball player
1984 – Blake Costanzo, American football player
  1984   – Charles Hamelin, Canadian speed skater
  1984   – Harumafuji Kōhei, Mongolian sumo wrestler, the 70th Yokozuna
  1984   – Tyler Thigpen, American football player
1986 – Matt Derbyshire, English footballer
1987 – Michael Baze, American jockey (d. 2011)
  1987   – Erwin Hoffer, Austrian footballer
  1987   – Wilson Kiprop, Kenyan runner
1988 – Eric Gryba, Canadian ice hockey player
  1988   – Eliška Klučinová, Czech heptathlete
  1988   – Brad Sinopoli, Canadian football player
1995 – Baker Mayfield, American football player
  1995   – Georgie Friedrichs, Australian rugby sevens player
1996 – Abigail Breslin, American actress
1999 – Chase Young, American football player

Deaths

Pre-1600
911  – Pope Sergius III, pope of the Roman Catholic Church
1070 – Gerard, Duke of Lorraine (b. c. 1030)
1099 – Conrad, Bishop of Utrecht (b. before 1040)
1132 – Mstislav I of Kiev (b. 1076)
1279 – Bolesław the Pious, Duke of Greater Poland (b. 1224)
1322 – Bartholomew de Badlesmere, 1st Baron Badlesmere, English soldier and politician, Lord Warden of the Cinque Ports (b. 1275)
1345 – Richard de Bury, English bishop and politician, Lord Chancellor of The United Kingdom (b. 1287)
1424 – Lucia Visconti, English countess (b. 1372)
1433 – Lidwina, Dutch saint (b. 1380)
1471 – Richard Neville, 16th Earl of Warwick, English commander and politician (b. 1428)
  1471   – John Neville, 1st Marquess of Montagu (b. 1431)
1480 – Thomas de Spens, Scottish statesman and prelate (b. c. 1415)
1488 – Girolamo Riario, Lord of Imola and Forli (b. 1443)
1574 – Louis of Nassau (b. 1538)
1578 – James Hepburn, 4th Earl of Bothwell, English husband of Mary, Queen of Scots (b. 1534)
1587 – Edward Manners, 3rd Earl of Rutland (b. 1548)
1599 – Henry Wallop, English politician (b. 1540)

1601–1900
1609 – Gasparo da Salò, Italian violin maker (b. 1540)
1662 – William Fiennes, 1st Viscount Saye and Sele, English politician (b. 1582)
1682 – Avvakum, Russian priest and saint (b. 1620)
1721 – Michel Chamillart, French politician, Controller-General of Finances (b. 1652)
1740 – Lady Catherine Jones, English philanthropist (b.1672)
1759 – George Frideric Handel, German-English organist and composer (b. 1685)
1785 – William Whitehead, English poet and playwright (b. 1715)
1792 – Maximilian Hell, Slovak-Hungarian astronomer and priest (b. 1720)
1843 – Joseph Lanner, Austrian violinist and composer (b. 1801)
1864 – Charles Lot Church, American-Canadian politician (b. 1777)
1886 – Anna Louisa Geertruida Bosboom-Toussaint, Dutch novelist (b. 1812)
1888 – Emil Czyrniański, Polish chemist (b. 1824)

1901–present
1910 – Mikhail Vrubel, Russian painter and sculptor (b. 1856)
1911 – Addie Joss, American baseball player and journalist (b. 1880)
  1911   – Henri Elzéar Taschereau, Canadian lawyer and jurist, 4th Chief Justice of Canada (b. 1836)
1912 – Henri Brisson, French politician, 50th Prime Minister of France (b. 1835)
1914 – Hubert Bland, English activist, co-founded the Fabian Society (b. 1855)
1916 – Gina Krog, Norwegian suffragist and women's rights activist (b. 1847)
1917 – L. L. Zamenhof, Polish physician and linguist, created Esperanto (b. 1859)
1919 – Auguste-Réal Angers, Canadian judge and politician, 6th Lieutenant Governor of Quebec (b. 1837)
1925 – John Singer Sargent, American painter (b. 1856)
1930 – Vladimir Mayakovsky, Georgian-Russian actor, playwright, and poet (b. 1893)
1931 – Richard Armstedt, German philologist, historian, and educator (b. 1851)
1935 – Emmy Noether, German-American mathematician and academic (b. 1882)
1938 – Gillis Grafström, Swedish figure skater and architect (b. 1893)
1943 – Yakov Dzhugashvili, Georgian-Russian lieutenant (b. 1907)
1950 – Ramana Maharshi, Indian guru and philosopher (b. 1879)
1951 – Al Christie, Canadian-American director, producer, and screenwriter (b. 1881)
1962 – M. Visvesvaraya, Indian engineer and scholar (b. 1860)
1963 – Rahul Sankrityayan, Indian monk and historian (b. 1893)
1964 – Tatyana Afanasyeva, Russian-Dutch mathematician and theorist (b. 1876)
  1964   – Rachel Carson, American biologist and author (b. 1907)
1968 – Al Benton, American baseball player (b. 1911)
1969 – Matilde Muñoz Sampedro, Spanish actress (b. 1900)
1975 – Günter Dyhrenfurth, German-Swiss mountaineer, geologist, and explorer (b. 1886)
  1975   – Fredric March, American actor (b. 1897)
1976 – José Revueltas, Mexican author and activist (b. 1914)
1978 – Joe Gordon, American baseball player and manager (b. 1915)
  1978   – F. R. Leavis, English educator and critic (b. 1895)
1983 – Pete Farndon, English bassist (The Pretenders) (b. 1952)
  1983   – Gianni Rodari, Italian journalist and author (b. 1920)
1986 – Simone de Beauvoir, French novelist and philosopher (b. 1908)
1990 – Thurston Harris, American singer (b. 1931)
  1990   – Olabisi Onabanjo, Nigerian politician, 3rd Governor of Ogun State (b. 1927)
1992 – Irene Greenwood, Australian radio broadcaster and feminist and peace activist (b. 1898)
1994 – Salimuzzaman Siddiqui, Pakistani chemist and scholar (b. 1897)
1995 – Burl Ives, American actor, folk singer, and writer (b. 1909)
1999 – Ellen Corby, American actress and screenwriter (b. 1911)
  1999   – Anthony Newley, English singer-songwriter and actor (b. 1931)
  1999   – Bill Wendell, American television announcer (b. 1924)
2000 – Phil Katz, American computer programmer, co-created the zip file format (b. 1962)
  2000   – August R. Lindt, Swiss lawyer and politician (b. 1905)
  2000   – Wilf Mannion, English footballer (b. 1918)
2001 – Jim Baxter, Scottish footballer (b. 1939)
  2001   – Hiroshi Teshigahara, Japanese director, producer, and screenwriter (b. 1927)
2003 – Jyrki Otila, Finnish politician (b. 1941)
2004 – Micheline Charest, English-Canadian television producer, co-founded the Cookie Jar Group (b. 1953)
2006 – Mahmut Bakalli, Kosovo politician (b. 1936)
2007 – June Callwood, Canadian journalist, author, and activist (b. 1924)
  2007   – Don Ho, American singer and ukulele player (b. 1930)
  2007   – René Rémond, French historian and economist (b. 1918)
2008 – Tommy Holmes, American baseball player and manager (b. 1917)
  2008   – Ollie Johnston, American animator and voice actor (b. 1912)
2009 – Maurice Druon, French author (b. 1918)
2010 – Israr Ahmed, Pakistani theologian and scholar (b. 1932)
  2010   – Alice Miller, Polish-French psychologist and author (b. 1923)
  2010   – Peter Steele, American singer-songwriter and bass player (b. 1962)
2011 – Jean Gratton, Canadian Roman Catholic bishop (b. 1924)
2012 – Émile Bouchard, Canadian ice hockey player and coach (b. 1919)
  2012   – Jonathan Frid, Canadian actor (b. 1924)
  2012   – Piermario Morosini, Italian footballer (b. 1986)
2013 – Efi Arazi, Israeli businessman, founded the Scailex Corporation (b. 1937)
  2013   – Colin Davis, English conductor and educator (b. 1927)
  2013   – R. P. Goenka, Indian businessman, founded RPG Group (b. 1930)
  2013   – George Jackson, American singer-songwriter (b. 1945)
  2013   – Armando Villanueva, Peruvian politician, 121st Prime Minister of Peru (b. 1915)
  2013   – Charlie Wilson, American politician (b. 1943)
  2013   – Claudia Maupin and Oliver "Chip" Northup, residents of Davis, California who were tortured, murdered, and mutilated in their home by a 15-year-old, Daniel William Marsh
2014 – Nina Cassian, Romanian poet and critic (b. 1924)
  2014   – Crad Kilodney, American-Canadian author (b. 1948)
  2014   – Wally Olins, English businessman and academic (b. 1930)
  2014   – Mick Staton, American soldier and politician (b. 1940)
2015 – Klaus Bednarz, German journalist and author (b. 1942)
  2015   – Mark Reeds, Canadian-American ice hockey player and coach (b. 1960)
  2015   – Percy Sledge, American singer (b. 1940)
  2015   – Roberto Tucci, Italian cardinal and theologian (b. 1921)
2019 – Bibi Andersson, Swedish actress (b.1935) 
2020 – Carol D'Onofrio, American public health researcher (b. 1936)
2021 – Bernie Madoff, American mastermind of the world's largest Ponzi scheme (b. 1938)
2022 – Mike Bossy, Canadian ice hockey player and sportscaster (b. 1957)
  2022   – Ilkka Kanerva, Finnish politician (b. 1948)
  2022   – Orlando Julius, Nigerian saxophonist, singer (b. 1943)

Holidays and observances
Ambedkar Jayanti (India)
Bengali New Year (Bangladesh)
Black Day (South Korea)
Christian feast day:
Anthony, John, and Eustathius
Bénézet
Henry Beard Delany (U.S. Episcopal Church)
Domnina of Terni
Lidwina
Peter González
Tiburtius, Valerian, and Maximus
April 14 (Eastern Orthodox liturgics)
Commemoration of Anfal Genocide Against the Kurds (Iraqi Kurdistan) 
Day of Mologa (Yaroslavl Oblast, Russia)
Day of the Georgian language (Georgia)
Dhivehi Language Day (Maldives)
N'Ko Alphabet Day (Mande speakers)
Pan American Day (several countries in the Americas)
Takayama Spring Festival begins (Takayama, Gifu Prefecture, Japan)
Youth Day (Angola)

References

Sources

External links

 BBC: On This Day
 
 Historical Events on April 14

Days of the year
April